Charles Chellapah (1939 – 14 February 1966) was a Singaporean photojournalist of Indian origin who was killed on assignment during the Vietnam War.

Biography
Chellapah (also known as Canagaratnam Chellappah) was born in Indonesia. Unable to find a job as a photojournalist he emigrated to Singapore. Stringing for the now defunct Malay Times Chellapah worked for two years in Jesselton, Borneo before arrived in Saigon on 21 January 1966. Freelancing for the Associated Press, he went to a place American GIs called "Hell's Half Acre". Some 25 miles north of Saigon, it was a densely jungled rubber plantation honey-combed with Viet Cong Tunnels and overrun by snipers. His dramatic close-up images of casualties and combat prompted AP photo editor Horst Faas to warn Chellappah to be more cautious and take fewer chances. On 14 February 1966, Chellapah was killed in another landmine blast while attempting to rescue soldiers hurt from a mine blast.

References
 Eastpix's coverage about Singaporean photographers killed in Vietnam war

Singaporean photographers
War photographers killed while covering the Vietnam War
1939 births
1966 deaths
Date of birth missing
Place of birth missing
Place of death missing